Sand is a small hamlet, located on the southern shore of Gruinard Bay, and lying to the west of the village of Laide in Ross and Cromarty, Scottish Highlands and is in the Scottish council area of Highland.

References

Populated places in Ross and Cromarty